Eostrobilops is a genus of air-breathing land snails, terrestrial pulmonate gastropod mollusks in the family Strobilopsidae.

Distribution 
This species of land snail occurs in Japan, Korea and China.

Species 
The genus Eostrobilops includes the following species:
 Eostrobilops coreana Pilsbry, 1927
 Eostrobilops diodontina (Heude)
 Eostrobilops hirasei (Pilsbry, 1908) - type species
 Eostrobilops nipponica Pilsbry, 1927

References

Further reading 
  Minato H. (1982). 日本のクチミゾガイ類. "Eostrobilops and Enteroplax from Japan (Strobilopsidae)". 日本貝類学会研究連絡誌 The Chiribotan. CiNii.

External links 

Strobilopsidae